Joe Salisbury (born 20 April 1992) is a British professional tennis player who is a former world No. 1 in doubles.

He is a five-time Grand Slam champion, having won the 2020 Australian Open, the 2021 US Open and the 2022 US Open in men's doubles, partnering Rajeev Ram. Salisbury has also won two mixed doubles titles, at the 2021 French Open and US Open alongside Desirae Krawczyk. He also finished runner-up at the 2021 Australian Open in men's doubles and the 2021 Wimbledon Championships in mixed doubles, with Ram and Harriet Dart respectively. In April 2022, Salisbury became the third British world No. 1 in either singles or doubles, after Jamie and Andy Murray. He has won twelve doubles titles on the ATP Tour, including three at Masters 1000 level, and the 2022 ATP Finals.

Salisbury made his Davis Cup debut for Great Britain in 2021, and also competed at the 2020 Summer Olympics alongside Andy Murray.

Personal
Salisbury is from Putney in southwest London. He went to King's College School, Wimbledon, leaving in 2010. He trained at the Sutton Tennis Centre under Jeremy Bates and played college tennis at the University of Memphis.

College career
Salisbury represented the Memphis Tigers from 2010 until his graduation in 2014. As he had experienced injury problems during his junior career  he was not heavily recruited by American colleges and the decision to offer him a spot at Memphis was a "gamble" on the part of head coach Paul Goebel.

Salisbury finished his college career with 97 doubles wins, the most in school history, and his 25 singles wins in his final year was also a Memphis record at the time.

Professional career

2014: ATP debut
Salisbury made his ATP Tour main-draw debut at the U.S. National Indoor Championships partnering David O'Hare, losing to the Bryan brothers in the first round.

2018: First ATP doubles title
He reached the semifinals in the Wimbledon men's doubles with Frederik Nielsen.

Playing alongside Ben McLachlan, he won his first ATP Tour doubles title at the Shenzhen Open.

2019-20: New partnership, Australian Open doubles title, world No. 3
At Wimbledon in 2019, he played alongside Rajeev Ram during the men's doubles. They made it to the round of 16.

Also with Ram, Salisbury won the 2020 Australian Open, beating wildcards Max Purcell and Luke Saville in the final. As a result, he reached a career-high ranking of world No. 3, on 10 February 2020.

2021: French Open mixed-doubles, US Open doubles & mixed, first Masters titles
He competed in the Australian Open with partner Rajeev Ram to defend their title, but they lost to Ivan Dodig and Filip Polášek in the final.

He won the mixed-doubles title at the French Open with Desirae Krawczyk. He also reached the mixed doubles final of the 2021 Wimbledon Championships partnering Harriet Dart.

He reached the final and won his first Masters 1000 in Canada at the National Bank Open with Ram, defeating world No. 1 and No. 2 Croatians, Pavic and Mektic, his second final for the year at a Masters level after the Italian Open, where they lost to the Croatian pair.

At the US Open Salisbury partnering with Ram reached the final, defeating Max Purcell/Matthew Ebden in a long and narrow three hours match with three tiebreaks, saving four match points in the quarterfinals and Sam Querrey/Steve Johnson in the semifinals. The pair won the men’s doubles championship, defeating Jamie Murray/Bruno Soares in the final. It was the first time in the Open Era that two Britons met in a major men's doubles final and the first time in 12 years that the US Open men’s doubles final went to a deciding set. As a result he equaled his best career ranking of World No. 3 in doubles on 20 September 2021. Seeded second, he also won his second mixed-doubles Grand Slam title at the US Open, again with Krawczyk, defeating Marcelo Arévalo and Giuliana Olmos in straight sets. He became the first man since Bob Bryan in 2010 to win the US Open doubles and mixed titles in the same year.

At the San Diego Open, Salisbury won his eight title and third of the season partnering Neal Skupski.

2022: World No. 1, US Open champion, Two Masters titles
At the Miami Open, Salisbury and Ram reached the quarterfinals, losing to eventual champions Hubert Hurkacz and John Isner. Following this result, Salisbury became the new world No. 1 in men's doubles on 4 April 2022. He became the second British man to be doubles number one, after Jamie Murray. He won the 2022 Monte-Carlo Masters with Ram defeating sixth seeded pair of Robert Farah and Juan Sebastian Cabal. The duo reached the semifinals at the 2022 Wimbledon Championships, losing to Matthew Ebden and Max Purcell in five sets. Ram and Salisbury had a successful summer hardcourt season, winning the 2022 Western & Southern Open and clinching their third Grand Slam title together while defending their title at the 2022 US Open with a straight-sets win over second seeds Neal Skupski and Wesley Koolhof.  They became just the second team to repeat as men's doubles champions at this Major in the Open Era other than Todd Woodbridge and Mark Woodforde who went also back-to-back in New York.

Significant finals

Grand Slam tournament finals

Men's doubles: 4 (3 titles, 1 runner-up)

Mixed doubles: 3 (2 titles, 1 runner-up)

Year-end championships

Doubles: 2 (1 title, 1 runner-up)

Masters 1000 finals

Doubles: 4 (3 titles, 1 runner-up)

ATP career finals

Doubles: 20 (12 titles, 8 runner-ups)

ATP Challenger and ITF Futures finals

Singles: 1 (1–0)

Doubles: 36 (18–17)

Doubles performance timeline 

Current through the 2023 BNP Paribas Open.

References

External links
 
 

1992 births
Living people
English male tennis players
British male tennis players
Memphis Tigers men's tennis players
Tennis people from Greater London
Universiade medalists in tennis
Universiade gold medalists for Great Britain
Australian Open (tennis) champions
French Open champions
US Open (tennis) champions
Grand Slam (tennis) champions in men's doubles
Grand Slam (tennis) champions in mixed doubles
Medalists at the 2015 Summer Universiade
Tennis players at the 2020 Summer Olympics
Olympic tennis players of Great Britain
ATP number 1 ranked doubles tennis players
People educated at King's College School, London